The equestrian events at the 1992 Barcelona Olympics included dressage, eventing, and show jumping. All three disciplines had both individual and team competitions.

Medal summary

Medals

Officials
Appointment of officials was as follows:

Dressage
  Wolfgang Niggli (Ground Jury President)
  Nicholas Williams (Ground Jury Member)
  Uwe Mechlem (Ground Jury Member)
  Eizo Osaka (Ground Jury Member)
  Eric Lette (Ground Jury Member)

Jumping
  José Alvarez de Bohorques (Ground Jury President)
  William C. Steinkraus (Ground Jury Member)
  Franz Pranter  (Ground Jury Member)
  Bo Helander  (Ground Jury Member)
  Nicholas Alvarez de Bohorques (Course Designer)
  Noel Vanososte (Technical Delegate)

Eventing
  Patrick Conolly-Carew (Ground Jury President)
  Bernd Springorum (Ground Jury Member)
  Giovanni Grignolo (Ground Jury Member)
  Wolfgang Feld (Course Designer)
  Michael Tucker (Technical Delegate)

References

External links
 Official Olympic Report

 
1992 Summer Olympics events
1992
1992 in equestrian